Otocinclus vittatus is a species of catfish in the family Loricariidae. It is native to South America, where it is known from the basins of the Amazon River, the Xingu River, the Paraguay River, the Orinoco, the Paraná River, and the Tocantins River. It reaches 3.3 cm (1.3 inches) in total length. The species is found in the aquarium trade, where it is usually known as either the common otocinclus or the dwarf otocinclus, both of which are names that are used for other related species.

In the aquarium

The common otocinclus is typically sold as an algae eater. It will rasp most kinds of algae from leaves, hard scape and glass. Unlike many fish sold under this label, this otocinclus is voracious and can starve if not given proper supplementary feedings after stripping an aquarium of all its preferred foods. This can be difficult, as they can be picky and may not take some foods.

The common otocinclus is a fragile fish, and it is almost always wild caught. Losses are not uncommon when adding a school to a tank. It should be kept in numbers, and will easily become stressed if kept without a sufficiently large school.

References 

Hypoptopomatini
Fish described in 1994
Fauna of South America